George Todd (birth unknown – death unknown) was an English professional rugby league footballer who played in the 1930s.

Playing career

International honours
George Todd won caps for England while at Hunslet in 1935 against France, and Wales, and in 1936 against Wales.

Challenge Cup Final appearances
George Todd played  in Halifax's 2–9 defeat by Leeds in the 1940–41 Challenge Cup Final during the 1940–41 season at Odsal, Bradford, in front of a crowd of 28,500.

County Cup Final appearances
George Todd played  in the Hunslet FC's 7–13 defeat by Hull Kingston Rovers in the 1929–30 Yorkshire County Cup Final during the 1929–30 season at Headingley Rugby Stadium, Leeds on Saturday 30 November 1929, in front of a crowd of 11,000.

References

External links

English rugby league players
Halifax R.L.F.C. players
Hunslet F.C. (1883) players
England national rugby league team players
Place of birth missing
Place of death missing
Rugby league five-eighths
Year of birth missing
Year of death missing